Istentales is a Sardinian ethnic pop-rock band. The group was formed in Sardinia in 1995 in Nuoro in Sardinia by Gigi Sanna.

History
The name of the band is taken from one of the most important constellations of the Northern Hemisphere cell, which in Italian is narrated by Orion. This constellation is based on the antiquity of the gabbale, which is oriented towards shepherds and masseurs, and is therefore rooted in the collective imagination of the Sardinian people. In 2003 the Istentales wrote the piece "Pro unu frore" for the daughter of Matteo Boe, killed in 2003 while she was on the balcony. The group was formed in 1995 in Nuoro in Sardinia. In 2002, the band collaborated and realized a singled called "Promissas" with Pierangelo Bertoli. In 2006, the saxophonist Simone Pala joined the group and Istentales released the album "Dae Sa Die ... A Sa Notte". In 2016, they made a tour with Tullio De Piscopo and also together with the Tazenda, another big folk band from Sardinia for the feast of Sant'Agostino in Muravera. In 2017 the band published the single "Notte E Luna"fe at. Danilo Sacco. In 2018 they realized the new single called "Lumeras" feat. Maria Luisa Congiu. In 2022, they released their album "Homines", featuring the single "O Sardigna" in feat. with Elio ( de Le Storie Tese) and Tenores di Neoneli, the barbaric band presents the second single from their new album, called “Sciopero” feat. with Modena City Ramblers.

Other work
The Istentales band also owns an agritourism called "Fattoria Istentale" in Nuoro. In addition to the agritourism, the band organize events where they also welcome the classes of elementary school children where they show how to make cheese and raise animals.

Discography

Studio albums
 1995 - "Istentales"
 1996 - "Naralu Tue"
 1997 - "Istentales sempre con voi".
 2000 - "Amsicora".
 2002 - "Deo no isco".
 2004 - "Annos".
 2005 - "Juan Peron Piras due nomi una persona" (live).
 2005 - "Due in uno..." (collida de sos primos duos album).
 2006 - "Animu".
 2007 - "Su Mezus", (CD-DVD).
 2008 - "Dae sa die...a sa notte".
 2020 - Tra il Sacro e Il Profano.
 2022 - Homines.

Singles
 2002 - "Viene per Noi" (feat. Pierangelo Bertoli)
 2002 - "Promisas" (feat. Pierangelo Bertoli)
 2017 - "Notte E Luna" (feat. Danilo Sacco)
 2018 - "Lumeras" (feat. Maria Luisa Congiu)
 2022 - “O Sardigna” (feat. Elio from  de Le Storie Tese)
 2022 - “Sciopero” (feat. Modena City Ramblers)

Line-up

Members
 Gigi Sanna – lead vocals & guitars (1995–present)
 Sandro Canova – bass, backing vocals (1995–present)
 Luciano Pigliari - keyboards (1995–present)
 Luca Floris – drums (1995–present)

Past members
 Paolo Fresu - flugelhorn (2006–2007)
 Luca Chessa - guitars
 Davide Guiso - guitars & flugelhorn
 Simone Pala - saxophone (2006–2008)
 Gian Piero Carta - saxophone
 Daniele Barbato - keyboards
 Massimiliano Ruiu - keyboards (2016)

Cooperations
 Paolo Fresu
 Nomadi
 Modena City Ramblers
 Elio e le Storie Tese
 Tullio De Piscopo
 Pierangelo Bertoli
 Benito Urgu
 Roberto Vecchioni
 Eugenio Finardi
 Cordas e Cannas

References

External links
fan-club website
Facebook
Instagram
Youtube

Folk rock groups
Musical groups established in 1995
Folk punk groups
1995 establishments in Italy
Italian folk music groups
Italian pop music groups
Italian rock music groups
Music in Sardinia